Roland Verwey (born December 27, 1981) is a German professional ice hockey player. He is currently playing for Krefeld Pinguine in the Deutsche Eishockey Liga (DEL).

Career statistics

References

External links

1981 births
Living people
Essen Mosquitoes players
Füchse Duisburg players
German ice hockey forwards
Iserlohn Roosters players
Krefeld Pinguine players
Sportspeople from Duisburg